The Players Tour Championship 2010/2011 started on 24 June 2010 and ended on 20 March 2011 with events held in Sheffield and Europe. The televised finals took place between the top 24 Order of Merit players, who have played at least 6 events (3 PTC and 3 EPTC).

Schedule

Order of Merit

Finals

The Finals of the Players Tour Championship 2010/2011 took place from 17 to 20 March 2011 at The Helix in Dublin, Ireland. It was contested by the top 24 players of the Order of Merit, who have played in at least 6 events (3 PTC and 3 EPTC).

Notes

References